Electronic Sports League Major Series One Katowice 2014, also known as EMS One Katowice 2014, was the second Counter-Strike: Global Offensive Major Championship. The tournament was held from March 13–16, 2014 at the Spodek Arena in Katowice, Silesian Voivodeship, Poland. It was organized by Electronic Sports League and sponsored by the game's developers Valve. The Polish roster of Virtus.pro won the event by beating Ninjas in Pyjamas in the finals. EMS One Katowice 2014 was streamed on Twitch and had a peak of over 250,000 concurrent viewers.

Format
The top eight teams from Dreamhack Winter 2013 qualified as Legends. Two teams were directly invited to participate in the tournament, while the remaining six teams qualified through an online qualifier that consisted of sixteen teams.

Teams were split up into four groups, and all group matches were best-of-ones. The highest seed would play the lowest seed in each group and the second and third seeds would play against each other. The winner of those two matches would play each other to determine which team moved on to the playoff stage, while the losers of the first round of matches also played. The loser of the lower match was then eliminated from the tournament. With one team advanced and one eliminated, the two remaining teams would play an elimination match for the second playoff spot. This format is known as the GSL format, named for the Global StarCraft II League.

The playoffs bracket consisted of eight teams, two from each group. All of these matches were best-of-three, single elimination. Teams advanced in the bracket until a winner was decided.

Map Pool
There were five maps to choose from: Dust II, Inferno, Mirage, Nuke, and Train. In the group stage, each team banned two maps and the match was played on the remaining map. In the playoffs, each team banned one map and chose one map; the remaining map would be the decider map of the best-of-three series, if needed.

Main Qualifier
Only teams from Europe competed in the main qualifier tournament. One team from the Nordic region, one team from France, one from the United Kingdom, one from Germany, two from the CIS region, and two from Poland played in their respective regional qualifiers to qualify for the main qualifier. In addition, four teams each advanced from two general European qualifiers to the main qualifier.

The main qualifier was a 16 team, best of three, double elimination bracket. A total of six teams advanced to the Major. Team iBUYPOWER from the United States and Vox Eminor from Australia did not have to play in any qualifier and were invited to play in the Major.

Teams Competing

Bracket

Broadcast Talent
Host
 Sean Charles

Analysts
 Scott "SirScoots" Smith
 Duncan "Thorin" Shields

Commentators
 Lauren "Pansy" Scott
 Stuart "TosspoT" Saw
 Jason Kaplan

Observer
 Joshua "steel" Nissan

Teams

Group stage

Group A

Group B

Group C

Group D

Playoffs

Bracket

Quarterfinals

Semifinals

Finals

Final standings

References

2014 in Polish sport
2014 in esports
Sports competitions in Katowice
Counter-Strike: Global Offensive Majors
ESL One Counter-Strike competitions
March 2014 sports events in Europe
21st century in Katowice